C. Denise Marcelle is a Democratic member of the Louisiana House of Representatives for District 61 in East Baton Rouge Parish, Louisiana. She succeeded her fellow Democrat Alfred C. Williams, who died in office on August 4, 2015.

In the primary election held on October 24, 2015, Marcelle won the right to succeed Williams by defeating a single opponent, her fellow Democrat Donna Collins-Lewis, 4,971 votes (60.6 percent) to 3,237 (39.4 percent).

Marcelle and the late State Representative Ronnie Edwards of District 29 both served on the Baton Rouge Metro-Council prior to their elections in 2015 to the state House. Edwards died in early 2016 of pancreatic cancer less than two months after taking office.

In 2016, she unsuccessfully ran to be mayor-president of Baton Rouge and the East Baton Rouge Parish.

References

Living people
Politicians from Baton Rouge, Louisiana
Democratic Party members of the Louisiana House of Representatives
Women state legislators in Louisiana
Women in Louisiana politics
African-American state legislators in Louisiana
Activists for African-American civil rights
Southern University alumni
Year of birth missing (living people)
21st-century American politicians
21st-century American women politicians
21st-century African-American women
21st-century African-American politicians